Ralph Steven Baric (born 1954) is William R. Kenan Jr. Distinguished Professor in the Department of Epidemiology, and professor in the Department of Microbiology and Immunology at The University of North Carolina at Chapel Hill.

Baric's work involves coronaviruses, including gain of function research aimed at devising effective vaccines against coronaviruses. Baric has warned of emerging coronaviruses presenting as a significant threat to global health, due to zoonosis. Baric's work has drawn criticism from some scientists and members of the public related to chimeric virus experiments conducted at UNC-Chapel Hill.

Career 
Baric has published multiple articles and book chapters on the epidemiology and genetics of various viruses, including  norovirus, and coronaviruses, as well as potential treatments for viral diseases.

In 2015, with Shi Zhengli of the Wuhan Institute of Virology, he published an article titled "A SARS-like cluster of circulating bat coronaviruses shows potential for human emergence," which describes their work in generating and characterizing a chimeric virus which added the spike of a bat coronavirus (SHC014) onto the backbone of a mouse-adapted SARS-CoV (rMA15). The research related to this article drew criticism from other scientists due to fears that the SHC014-rMA15 chimeric virus could have pandemic potential. This concern was renewed  and echoed by members of the public during the COVID-19 pandemic. Experts have noted that the virus was adapted to a mouse model and had decreased virulence in human tissues. The chimeric virus was also less virulent than the wild type rMA15 virus, as is expected in most chimeras.

In 2020, Baric contributed to establishing the official nomenclature and taxonomic classification of SARS-CoV-2. In 2021, he was elected member of the U. S. National Academy of Sciences.

References

External links 

Ralph S. Baric, PhD

1954 births 
Living people
American virologists
COVID-19 researchers
American epidemiologists
North Carolina State University alumni
Members of the United States National Academy of Sciences